Notable persons who were born, grew up in or spent a portion of their life and/or career in Regina, Saskatchewan.

A
 Velma Abbott (1929–1987), All-American Girls Professional Baseball League player'
 Dan Achen, guitarist, producer, co-founder of alternative rock band Junkhouse
 Josh Archibald, professional ice hockey player for the Pittsburgh Penguins
 Dick Assman, gas station attendant facetiously given fame on the David Letterman television show

B
 Joseph Baggaley (c. 1884–1918) trade unionist
 Bonnie Baker (1918–2003), All-American Girls Professional Baseball League player
 Henry Baker, former Regina Mayor, former Member of Saskatchewan Legislative Assembly
 Staff Barootes (1918–2000), Senator
 Doris Barr (1921–2009), All-American Girls Professional Baseball League player
 Ethan Bear, hockey player in the NHL currently playing for the Vancouver Canucks
 Carla Beck, Member of Saskatchewan Legislative Assembly, current Leader of the Official Opposition
 Catherine Bennett (born 1920), All-American Girls Professional Baseball League player
 Red Berenson, Team Canada 1972, former NHL player and coach, Head Coach of the University of Michigan Ice Hockey Team
 Mike Blaisdell, former NHL player
 Allan Blakeney, former Premier of Saskatchewan
 Ronald Bloore, Regina Five artist
 Bob Boyer, visual artist, elder, university professor
 Tyler Bozak, NHL player
 Beverley Breuer, actor whose credits include Scary Movie 4
 Ivan Brown, CFL player
 Jake Burt, Regina-born CFL player
 Garth Butcher, NHL player

C
 Jock Callander, IHL all-time scoring leader
 Ruth Chambers, sculptor
 Kale Clague, NHL player
 Dan Clark, CFL player
 Jason Clermont, CFL player
 Terry Cochrane, Canadian football player
 Martha Cole, fabric artist
 Meara Conway, Member of Saskatchewan Legislative Assembly

D
 Charlie David, actor
 Stu Davis, (aka "Canada's Cowboy Troubadour"), singer/guitarist, known internationally for songwriting, recordings, radio and television
 Robert Dirk, former NHLer
 Shirley Douglas, actor, daughter of T.C. Douglas; mother of Kiefer Sutherland
 T.C. Douglas, CCF premier 1944–1961; later leader of the federal New Democratic Party
 Dave Dryburgh (1908–1948), Scotland-born sports journalist for The Leader-Post and Canadian Football Hall of Fame inductee
 Duke Dukowski, former NHLer
 Matt Dumba, NHL player for the Minnesota Wild

E
 Jordan Eberle, NHL player for the Edmonton Oilers, New York Islanders and Seattle Kraken
 Murray Edwards, one of the richest Canadians
 Jack Engle, hot rodder and custom camshaft grinder, founder of Engle Cams (to American parents)
 Zack Evans, CFL player

F
 Joe Fafard, sculptor and artist
 Holly Fay, painter
 Scott Flory, current University of Saskatchewan Football Head Coach, former CFL player
 Stu Foord, CFL player
 Leanne Franson, cartoonist and illustrator
 Jackie Friesen, assistant coach with the Wisconsin Badgers women's ice hockey team

G
 Genevieve George (1927–2002), All-American Girls Professional Baseball League player
 Tamon George, Canadian Football player
 Chris Getzlaf, CFL player
 Ryan Getzlaf, NHL player
 Ted Godwin, Regina Five artist
 Ralph Goodale, politician
 Dirk Graham, NHL player
 Roland Groome, first licensed commercial pilot in Canada

H
 Josh Hagerty, CFL player
 Jack Hamilton (1886–1976), Canadian ice hockey and multi-sport executive
 Kevin Hanson, basketball player and coach
 Ben Hebert, curler
Trevor Herriot a naturalist and writer
 Scott Hartnell, NHL player
 Ben Heenan, CFL player
 Kyle Herranen, interdisciplinary artist
 Jamie Heward, NHL player
 Bill Hicke, NHL player with the Montreal Canadiens, New York Rangers, Oakland Seals, and the Pittsburgh Penguins
 Jim Hopson, CFL player and executive
 Risa Horowitz, visual and media artist
 Neal Hughes, CFL player
 Nick Hutchins, Canadian Football player

I
 Roger Ing, painter
 Into Eternity, progressive metal band 
 Dick Irvin, Jr., hockey broadcaster

J
 Colin James (born 1964), singer. James has won seven Juno Awards
 Christine Jewitt (1926-2018), All-American Girls Professional Baseball League player
 Arleene Johnson (1924–2017), All-American Girls Professional Baseball League player
 Evan Johnson, CFL player
 Marguerite Jones (1917–1995), All-American Girls Professional Baseball League player
 Daisy Junor (1919–2012), All-American Girls Professional Baseball League player

K
 Connie Kaldor, singer-songwriter
 Matt Kellett, CFL player
 Augustus Kenderdine, painter
 Donald M. Kendrick, Calgary native, choral conductor and teacher at the University of Saskatchewan, Regina Campus, in the 1970s
 Roy Kiyooka, painter
 Morgan Klimchuk, AHL player for the Belleville Senators
 Marty Klyne, Canadian Senator
 Rory Kohlert, CFL player
 Chris Kramer, actor
 Chris Kunitz, NHL player

L
 Michelle LaVallee, curator, artist, and educator
 Brayden Lenius, CFL player
 Brock Lesnar: WWE and UFC Champion living in Regina
 Elyse Levesque, actress, born and raised in Regina
 Sarah Lind, actor
 Dwain Lingenfelter, politician
 Kenneth Lochhead, Regina Five artist
 Andrea Ludwig, soprano

M
 Jeannie Mah, ceramic artist
 Gene Makowsky, current Member of Saskatchewan Legislative Assembly, former CFL player
John Joseph "Jack" Malone, ace fighter pilot in WWI, lived in Regina before enlisting
Ted Malone, former Member of Saskatchewan Legislative Assembly, former Leader of the Opposition
Russ Marchuk, politician
 Daniel Maslany, actor
 Tatiana Maslany, actress
 Mike Maurer, CFL player
 Warren McCall, former Member of Saskatchewan Legislative Assembly
 Ethel McCreary, All-American Girls Professional Baseball League player
 Mick McGeough, NHL referee
 Frances Gertrude McGill, pioneering forensic pathologist and criminologist
 Arthur McKay, Regina Five artist 
 Craig McMorris, snowboarder
 Don McMorris, politician
 Mark McMorris, snowboarding, bronze medalist winter Olympic winner on 2018 Winter Olympics Pyeongchang and 18 time Xgames medalist.
 Gerry Minor, former NHL player
 Douglas Morton, Regina Five artist
 Marc Mueller, CFL coach
 Garth Murray, NHL player
 Ryan Murray, NHL player
 Maye Musk, model and mother of entrepreneur, Elon Musk

N
 Steve Nash, former basketball player and head basketball coach
 Zarqa Nawaz, creator of the CBC sitcom Little Mosque on the Prairie
 Patrick Neufeld, CFL player
 Erik Nielsen, federal politician, former deputy prime minister
 Leslie Nielsen, actor whose credits include Airplane!, three Naked Gun movies and Scary Movie 3
 John Nilson, politician

O
 Jeremy O'Day, current CFL executive, former CFL player
 Paul Owen, cricketer

P
 Michael Peers, Archbishop of Qu'Appelle; Primate of the Anglican Church of Canada 1986–2004
 Janet Perkin (1921–2012), professional baseball and curling player
 Al Pickard (1895–1975), Canadian Amateur Hockey Association president and Hockey Hall of Fame inductee
 Jason Plumb, popular musician formerly with the Waltons
 David Plummer, software engineer for Microsoft MS-DOS and Microsoft Windows
 Edward Poitras, multimedia artist
 Logan Pyett, AHL player and member of gold medal-winning Team Canada in 2005–2006 (U18 Junior World Cup) and 2007–08 (World Junior Championship)

R
 Roger Reinson, CFL player
 Addison Richards, CFL player
 Erika Ritter, playwright and broadcaster
 Martha Rommelaere (1922–2011), All-American Girls Professional Baseball League player
Jon Ryan (1982), NFL and CFL player
Metro Rybchuk, politician

S
 Johnny Sandison, radio personality, weather presenter
 Nicole Sarauer, Saskatchewan MLA and former Leader of the Official Opposition
 Andrew Scheer, politician
 Stu Scheurwater, Current Major League Baseball Umpire 
 Karl Schubach, vocalist of metalcore band Misery Signals
 Jack Semple, blues guitarist
 Lyldoll, singer
 Andy Shauf, musician
 Mike Sillinger, NHL player
 Randy Srochenski, CFL player
 Charley Stis (1884–1979), professional baseball player, manager and umpire
 Leesa Streifler, multimedia artist
 Stephen Surjik, television and motion picture director whose credits include The Kids in the Hall and Wayne's World 2

T
 Dione Taylor, jazz singer

V
 Harry Van Mulligen, politician
 Darren Veitch, former NHL player
 Julia Voth, actress and model

W
 Mildred Warwick (1922–2006), All-American Girls Professional Baseball League player 
 Elizabeth Wicken (1927–2011), All-American Girls Professional Baseball League player
 Doug Wickenheiser (1961–99), NHL player
 Paul Woldu, CFL player
 Trent Wotherspoon, politician

See also
List of people from Prince Albert, Saskatchewan
List of people from Saskatoon

References

 
Reginans
People